Buffalo Creek may refer to:

Waterways in the United States

Arkansas
Buffalo Creek (Mountain Fork), a stream in Polk County

Illinois
Buffalo Creek (Illinois)

Iowa
Buffalo Creek (Clear Creek tributary), a stream in Iowa
Buffalo Creek (Wapsipinicon River tributary), a river in Iowa; see

Minnesota
Buffalo Creek (Crow River tributary)
Buffalo Creek (Crow Wing County, Minnesota)

Missouri
Buffalo Creek (Blackwater River tributary), a stream in Missouri 
Buffalo Creek (Current River tributary), a stream in Missouri 
Buffalo Creek (Elk River tributary, Oklahoma), a stream in Missouri and Oklahoma
Buffalo Creek (Mississippi River tributary), a stream in Missouri

New York
Buffalo River (New York), known as Buffalo Creek southeast of the city of Buffalo
Treaties of Buffalo Creek

North Carolina
Buffalo Creek (Deep River tributary), a stream in Moore County 
Buffalo Creek (Reedy Fork tributary), a stream in Guilford County

Oklahoma
Buffalo Creek (Mountain Fork), a stream in McCurtain County

Pennsylvania
Buffalo Creek (Allegheny River tributary)
Buffalo Creek (Juniata River tributary)
Buffalo Creek (Ohio River tributary)
Buffalo Creek (West Branch Susquehanna River tributary)

South Carolina
Buffalo Creek (South Carolina)

South Dakota
Buffalo Creek (Dewey County, South Dakota)
Buffalo Creek (Harding County, South Dakota)
Buffalo Creek (Lake and Minnehaha counties, South Dakota)

Texas
Buffalo Creek (Texas)

West Virginia
Buffalo Creek (Guyandotte River tributary), in Logan County
Buffalo Creek flood, involving the above creek
Buffalo Creek (Monongahela River tributary), in Marion County
Buffalo Creek (Ohio River tributary), in Brooke County
Buffalo Creek (South Branch Potomac River tributary), in Hampshire County

Settlements
Buffalo Creek, Northern Territory, Australia
Buffalo Creek, Colorado, U.S.
Warrensville, North Carolina, U.S., formerly called Buffalo Creek

See also
Big Buffalo Creek
Buffalo River (disambiguation)